Tatsuhiro (written: 龍弘, 辰寛, 達弘, 達裕, 立裕, 立禮, 竜拓 or 竜洋) is a masculine Japanese given name. Notable people with the name include:

, Japanese daimyō
, Japanese judoka
, Japanese footballer
, Japanese writer and playwright
, Japanese footballer
, Japanese baseball player
, Japanese baseball player
, Japanese sport wrestler

Fictional characters
, protagonist of the manga series Welcome to the N.H.K.

Japanese masculine given names